This is a list of all cricketers who have captained the United Arab Emirates in an official international match, including One Day International and Twenty20 International matches.

One Day International

Last updated 18 August 2022.

Twenty20 International

Last updated 18 August 2022.

ICC Trophy (non-ODI)

The United Arab Emirates debuted in the ICC Trophy in the 1993/94 tournament

References

External links
Cricinfo
UAE ICC Trophy captains at Cricket Archive 

Cricket captains
Cricket captains
United Arab Emirates
Cricket captains
United Arab Emirates in international cricket